St. John Fisher Ibanda Secondary School is a Ugandan Catholic boys-only boarding secondary school, located in the town of Ibanda in the Ibanda District of the Western Region.

History and operations
The school was founded by the Brothers of Christian Instruction in 1966.

Its headmaster is Brother Tamale Herman. As of February 2016, 648 students were enrolled and lived at the school.

The school is named for Saint John Fisher.

Ibanda Secondary School is under the Brothers of Christian Instruction. It is well known in Uganda particularly in western Uganda as a single (boys) school. Ibanda ss has been one of the best performing schools in Academics, discipline and Sports within the district and allover Uganda overs the years.

Ibanda secondary school in 2022 participated in the national football champions where they managed to be the third in their group

See also

 Education in Uganda
 List of boarding schools
 List of schools in Uganda
 Roman Catholicism in Uganda

References

External links
 , the school's official website
schoolnetuganda.com, Uganda Schools' Portal

1966 establishments in Uganda
Boarding schools in Uganda
Boys' schools in Uganda
Christian schools in Uganda
Educational institutions established in 1966
Ibanda District
Catholic Church in Uganda
Catholic secondary schools in Africa
Secondary schools in Uganda